The discography of Japanese singer songwriter Ua consists of eight studio albums, four live albums, three compilation albums, two collaboration albums, two extended plays, nineteen singles and four video albums.

Discography

Studio albums

Live albums

Compilation albums

Side projects

Extended plays

Singles

Video releases

Video/live albums
 1998: Ametora '98
 2003: Sora no Koya
 2003: Illuminate: The Very Best Clips
 2004: Do Re Mi no TV Vol.1
 2004: Do Re Mi no TV Vol.2
 2004: Do Re Mi no TV Vol.3
 2004: Do Re Mi no TV Vol.4
 2004: Do Re Mi no TV Vol.5

References

External links

Discographies of Japanese artists
Discography